The Kenyon and Leigh Junction Railway (K&LJR) was constructed to link the Bolton and Leigh Railway (B&LR), which terminated at the Leigh Branch of the Leeds and Liverpool Canal, with the Liverpool and Manchester Railway (L&MR) at Kenyon.

The B&LR obtained an Act of Parliament giving it the right to lease the K&LJR in 1836. On 8 August 1845, along with the B&LR and the L&MR, the K&LJR was amalgamated into the Grand Junction Railway (GJR) which, with others, became part of the London and North Western Railway (LNWR) on 16 July 1846.

The  line started from the B&LR's terminus in Westleigh and crossed the Leeds and Liverpool Canal before heading south towards Kenyon. Stations were built at Bradshaw Leach and Kenyon. As soon as it opened on 3 January 1831, goods trains could access  of line between Bolton and Liverpool and a few months later a passenger service to Liverpool started.  John Hargreaves, an established carrier in Bolton leased the running rights over the K&LJR and the L&MR using his own engines and rolling stock until 31 December 1845. Regular passenger services between Bolton and Kenyon ended in March 1954 and traffic from Leigh ended when the Tyldesley Loopline was closed in 1969.

Background
Nine of the Kenyon and Leigh Junction Railway (K&LJR) Company's board of 13 directors were members of the Liverpool and Manchester Railway (L&MR) Company. The southern end of the B&LR was near the north bank of the Leigh branch of the Leeds and Liverpool Canal where it had transhipment facilities. In 1825 the B&LR had experienced considerable opposition to its bill in Parliament and, to ensure its passing, had agreed to not cross either the Leeds and Liverpool or the Bridgewater Canals making the B&LR into a feeder for the canal. When the K&LJR presented its bill to Parliament in 1828, MPs were more amenable towards railway companies and the canal company withdrew its opposition to the railway crossing the canal. In 1829 the company received royal assent to build a single-track line from the end of the Bolton and Leigh Railway near Twiss (now Twist) Lane in Westleigh to Kenyon, where a junction would be made with the L&MR which was at an advanced stage of construction.

As compensation the K&LJR was required to pay the canal company £500 (equivalent to £ in ) and another £15 (equivalent to £ in ) per day for interruptions to canal traffic during the bridge's construction. The company raised the estimated cost of the line, £22,946, (equivalent to £ in ) by issuing shares.

Construction

The line of the railway was surveyed by Robert Stephenson and the engineer in charge was either Charles Vignoles or John Rastrick.

In September 1829 the railway company asked for tenders, in one sum, to be received by 1 October, to complete the entire railway line. Plans could be seen at the company's office in John St Liverpool or at Mr Rastrick's office in Stourbridge. The company would provide the land, wrought iron rails, cast iron rail chairs, castings and iron work for the turn outs but everything else would have to be provided including the workforce.

When built, it crossed the Bolton and St Helens turnpike road via a level crossing. The crossing was replaced by an overbridge when the line was doubled in 1864. The K&LJR joined the L&MR at a triangular junction. The K&LJR line towards Liverpool passed through Bolton Junction station, the line towards Manchester avoided it. The link in the Manchester direction was closed by the time the 1849 Ordnance Survey map was published.
 
The canal bridge was substantially rebuilt in the mid 1930s and in turn was replaced by a concrete bridge carrying the A579 Atherleigh Way in the mid 1980s. The road was built on the line of the former railway.

Opening and operation
The line opened on 3 January 1831 for freight traffic between Bolton and Liverpool. A special train for "Gentlemen" ran from Bolton to Newton Races on 2 June 1831.
The journey took an hour and 40 minutes  The K&LJR and B&LR worked closely as trains ran over both lines to access the Liverpool and Manchester line. Two passenger trains daily ran in each direction between Bolton and Liverpool one in the morning and the other in the afternoon, each train providing inside covered accommodation and outside wooden seats in open wagons. Passengers for Manchester needed to change trains at Bolton Junction.

In 1834 the B&LR leased the running of the railway to John Hargreaves, an established carrier of Bolton. Hargreaves was granted running rights over the K&LJR and the L&MR using his own engines and rolling stock. Hargreaves was an established carrier on roads and canals before the railway was built and the main carrier from north west England into Scotland, the equal of Pickfords who controlled the trade to the south of Manchester. By the mid 1830s Hargreaves had about 200 wagons. Hargreaves became a pioneer of excursions by rail, running Sunday trips from Bolton to Liverpool as early as 1841. In 1843 he ran excursions to London and two years later to Manchester. The GJR terminated the Hargreaves leases on 31 December 1845.

Meanwhile the B&LR obtained an Act of Parliament giving it the right to lease the K&LJR for 25 years or purchase it for £44,750 ( (equivalent to £ in ) in 1836.

In 1844 the Liverpool and Manchester Railway had been negotiating with the Bolton and Leigh Railway and the K&LJR with a view to an amalgamation, these negotiations were made more complicated by the initial inclusion of the North Union Railway in the proposed merger and then even more complicated when the Grand Junction Railway became interested, all the lines were connected and provided through running for each other's trains. Negotiations were reaching their conclusions when the NUR shareholders rejected their part in the amalgamation. At this juncture the K&LJR simplified the arrangements by agreeing to be purchased outright by the B&LR (under the provisions of the 1836 Act) so the amalgamation took place on 8 August 1845 without the NUR and the K&LJR became part of an enlarged Grand Junction Railway.

The following year on 16 July 1846 the GJR was amalgamated with others into the London and North Western Railway (L&NWR).

Stations and junctions
Two stations were opened on the line:
Bolton Junction opened on 15 September 1830 on the L&MR and was renamed  in June 1843. Shaw suggests that two stations may have been built at Bolton Junction, one at the terminus of the K&LJR and the L&MR station, although this may mean the platforms were not connected. Butt records a single station.
Bradshaw Leach opened on 11 June 1831 together with the other passenger facilities on the B&LR and was renamed  in 1877.

A junction was formed to the north of Pennington station in 1864 when the LNWR's Tyldesley Loopline opened via Bedford Leigh and the track between Kenyon Junction and the junction at Pennington was doubled at a cost of £7,000 (equivalent to £ in ). Double track north from the Pennington junction to Atherton Junction opened on 31 May 1880.

In 1885 the junction with the Tyldesley Loopline, by now known as Pennington South Junction, became more complicated when the LNWR opened the Westleigh Line slightly to its north providing a connection to the Tyldesley to Wigan line at Bickershaw.

East and west junctions north of Pennington station were made in 1903 when the L&NWR constructed two link lines between the Tyldesley Loopline and the Westleigh Line bridging over the Bolton & Kenyon Line and a mineral line to collieries in Westleigh.

Closure
Regular passenger services on the line between Bolton and Kenyon ended on 29 March 1954 but wakes week traffic to North Wales continued until 1958. With the demise of goods traffic, Crook Street Yard in Bolton closed in April 1965 and private sidings were closed by October 1967. The only coal traffic using the line in the 1960s was from Jackson's sidings in Tyldesley. Passenger traffic from the Tyldesley Loopline closed following the Beeching cuts on 5 May 1969 when all the stations on that line were closed. The track was lifted by 1969.

References

Notes

Citations

Bibliography

External links
  OS map of railways around Pennington Lancashire CII.6 (Abram; Golborne; Leigh) 1807 from National Library of Scotland

Early British railway companies
Railway companies established in 1829
Railway lines opened in 1831
British companies established in 1829